Emma Peel is a fictional spy played by Diana Rigg in the British 1960s adventure television series The Avengers, and by Uma Thurman in the 1998 film version. She was born Emma Knight, the daughter of an industrialist, Sir John Knight. She is the crime-fighting partner of John Steed.

As a lady spy adventurer and expert in martial arts, she became a feminist role model around the world and is considered an icon of British popular culture. Regarded as a 1960s fashion icon and sex symbol, the character is often remembered for the leather catsuit sometimes worn by Rigg in the first series.

Casting
Mrs. Peel was introduced as a replacement for the popular character Cathy Gale, played by actress Honor Blackman. Blackman left the programme at the end of the third season to co-star in the James Bond film Goldfinger.

Elizabeth Shepherd was initially cast as Emma Peel and production on the fourth series began. After filming all of one episode and part of a second, the producers decided that Shepherd was not suitable for the part, and she was dismissed. No footage of Shepherd as Peel is known to have survived.

The producers had to quickly replace her and gave the job to Diana Rigg; the episodes with Shepherd were then subsequently re-filmed.

Character
The character was particularly notable for a number of characteristics. Peel is a strong heroine; she is rarely defeated in fights and is capable of rescuing Steed if he is in trouble. She is a master of martial arts and a formidable fencer. A certified genius, she specialises in chemistry and other sciences. She is often seen in episodes engaging in artistic hobbies and had success in industry at the helm of the company of her late father, Sir John Knight. Her husband, Peter Peel, was a pilot whose plane had disappeared over the Amazonian forest. He was presumed dead for many years, and Peel went on to work with Steed. She drove a convertible Lotus Elan at high speeds, and convincingly portrayed any series of undercover roles, from nurse to nanny. Her favourite guise was that of a women's magazine reporter, trying to interview big business tycoons and rich playboys. The name "Emma Peel" is a play on the phrase "Man Appeal" or "M. Appeal", which the production team stated was one of the required elements of the character. (Diana Rigg was never comfortable in her position as a world-famous sex-symbol.)

Peel's verbal interactions with Steed range from witty banter to thinly disguised innuendo. Regarding the constant question of whether they had a sexual relationship at any time, Patrick Macnee thought the characters went to bed on a very regular basis (just not in view of the camera). However, Rigg thought they were most likely engaging in an enjoyable extended flirtation that ultimately went nowhere. Writer/producer Brian Clemens said he wrote them with the idea that they had an affair before Emma's first appearance in the series, and they certainly appear to already know each other very well when Emma is first introduced to the series.

Her style of dress typified the period, and the character is still a fashion icon. John Bates was brought in as the costume designer for Emma Peel in the second half of the fourth series. He created a wardrobe of black and white op-art mod clothing and miniskirts. Before this, people had believed that lines, circles and other bold patterns would not work on the television cameras of the day. Episodes were filmed before the miniskirt had even become a mainstream fashion statement. Bates had to stop leaving hems on the mini skirts because the production team kept lowering them again. He also licensed his designs to several manufacturers under the Avengerswear label and these pieces were sold in various shops throughout the country. Diana Rigg is often remembered for the leather catsuit she wore early on in her first season. Rigg disliked wearing the leather outfit, so Bates designed softer stretch jersey and PVC catsuits for her instead.

When the show transitioned from black and white to colour, the designer was Alun Hughes, who used bold colours and lurid, psychedelic patterns. Hughes also created the Emmapeeler catsuit, which was made of stretch jersey in bright block colours. The Emmapeelers and several other pieces from this season's wardrobe were licensed and sold in women's fashion shops as well.

Departure
When her husband, Peter Peel, surprisingly reappears at the end of "The Forget-Me-Knot", Emma decides to leave Steed and her spy career behind. In the distant shot in which he appears, Peter Peel looks suspiciously like Steed (and was in fact played by Patrick Macnee's stunt double, Peter Weston), and like Steed, he drives a two-door convertible Bentley, albeit a contemporary model. Emma meets her replacement, Tara King (played by Linda Thorson), who enters the building as she herself is leaving and tells her that Steed likes his tea stirred "anti-clockwise". Peel would be the last of the "talented amateurs" with whom John Steed was teamed, as her successor is a neophyte professional agent.

In real life, Diana Rigg had chosen to leave the series for a number of reasons, one of which was to accept a role in the James Bond film On Her Majesty's Secret Service (similarly, her predecessor Honor Blackman departed to appear in the Bond film Goldfinger).
During her first series, Rigg eventually discovered that she was being paid less than the cameramen: afterwards her salary was tripled and combined with her loyalty to Macnee, she was persuaded to come back for 25 additional episodes (including her farewell episode, which was actually shot well into the Tara King season). Eventually the arduous shooting schedules, various conflicts with the producers, the lure of film and stage roles, and a desire to challenge herself as an actress all combined in her decision to leave the show for good.

After leaving the series, Rigg played a variation of the Emma Peel character in two German short films produced for the 8mm market: The Diadem and The Mini-Killers. Little behind the scenes information has surfaced, though the films themselves have survived.

The New Avengers
Emma Peel re-appeared on The New Avengers using archive clips from the original series, featured in the episode entitled "K is for Kill". She briefly speaks with Steed over the phone and mentions that her last name isn't Peel anymore; Steed replies, "You'll always be Mrs. Peel to me." Sue Lloyd provided her voice for the new dialogue.

The Avengers (1998)
The character was revived and reworked for the 1998 film version of the show, [[The Avengers (1998 film)|The Avengers]]. Uma Thurman was cast in the role of Peel opposite Ralph Fiennes as Steed. In the film, Mrs. Peel is a scientist working as part of a weather project. When the project is sabotaged by someone who appears to be her double, she is investigated by Ministry agent John Steed. Ultimately, they team up to find out the truth. The film was a critical and box office failure with the new incarnation of the characters being panned. In 2003, Total Film magazine voted Fiennes and Thurman as "The Worst Movie Double Act of All Time" for their performances as Steed and Peel.

References in popular culture

Comics
In 1991’s Doctor Who Monthly #173, Gary Russell and artists Mike Collins and Steve Pini show Captain Britain about to hit John Steed when Emma Peel shows up behind him.
Emma Peel and John Steed were spotted in the crowd in Kingdom Come #2 (1996) by Mark Waid and Alex Ross, where they are both in a bar scene. 
A thinly veiled version of Emma Peel appears in Alan Moore's comic The League of Extraordinary Gentlemen: Black Dossier, as the young "Emma Night", daughter of industrialist Sir John Night, where she shares a mutual attraction with "Jimmy", of whom her paternal "Uncle Hugo" disapproves. 
She returns in The League of Extraordinary Gentlemen, Volume III: Century 2009 (Chapter 3. Let It Come Down) as the new "M", head of MI5. She is drawn to resemble Judi Dench's M from the James Bond films. 
The late 1960s revamping of Wonder Woman by Mike Sekowsky as a mod-dressing, karate-chopping but non-superpowered feminist icon was directly modeled on Mrs. Peel.

Music
The music video for the Pretenders' 1986 single "Don't Get Me Wrong" is a tribute to The Avengers and inserts lead singer Chrissie Hynde into the role of Emma Peel. Other tracks related to Emma Peel include:Emma Peel Sessions (1993) is Purple Avengers' second LP release.Thin Red Line (1980), the debut album of The Cretones, includes a song titled "Mrs. Peel".
The clip for "Emma Peel" from The Allies' debut album, Allies (1982), gave the band fleeting national recognition.Pet Your Friends (1995), Dishwalla's debut, includes a song titled "Miss Emma Peel".
The French rock band Matmatah, in its debut album La Ouache, included a whole song called Emma dedicated to Emma Peel. She also appears at the end of the official clip for another song, Lambé an Dro.
The Ann Arbor band Slot released a 7" single called "Emma Peel" in the 1990s.
The 4th track from Shark Inferno's album Puncture (2015) is titled, and about, "Emma Peel".
Pussy Galore has one CD track titled "Play Emma For Me", on Sympathy For The Record Industry (1996).
Babette Novak of Babette's Feast and Femme de Champagne wrote a song titled "A-Peel", in 1984.

TV
In the Good Eats episode, "Flat is Beautiful" (Episode: EA1C11), Alton Brown states the name of his pizza peel is "Emma".
 In Married... with Children season 9, episode 3, Al tries to buy her VHS tapes.
The character Anita Knight, from BBC's cartoon The Secret Show is slightly similar to Emma.

References and sources
References

Sources
Alvarez, Maria (1998), "Feminist icon in a catsuit (female lead character Emma Peel in defunct 1960s UK TV series 'The Avengers')", New Statesman, Aug 14.
Cornell, Paul; Day, Martin; & Topping, Keith (1998). The Avengers Dossier. London: Virgin Books. .
 Lars Baumgart (2002): DAS KONZEPT EMMA PEEL – Der unerwartete Charme der Emanzipation: THE AVENGERS und ihr Publikum''. Kiel: Verlag Ludwig – 

!colspan="3" style="background:#C1D8FF;"| Status

Female characters in television
America's Best Comics characters
Fictional English people
Fictional women soldiers and warriors
Fictional British secret agents
The Avengers (TV series) characters
Martial artist characters in television